Shmuel Kozokin (born 16 November 1987) is an Israeli former footballer. Kozokin was a defender. He won a gold medal with Team Israel at the 2005 Maccabiah Games. He played for the Israel national under-19 football team, the Israel national under-21 football team, the Israel national football team, Beitar Jerusalem,  Hapoel Kfar Saba, and  Ironi Beit Shemesh. Today he is a sport teacher in high school.

Biography
He was born in Moscow, Russia,  in the USSR in 1987. When he was four years old his family immigrated to Israel and lives in Beit Shemesh. At the age on nine he joined a football school, and at the age of 14 joined the youth team of Beitar Jerusalem.

He was part of the Israeli team at the 2005 Maccabiah Games that won the football gold medal.

He played for the Israel national under-19 football team in 2005–06.  With the youth team he won the 2005–06 Israeli youth-teams-cup, and he was brought up to the mature team. He was part of the mature squad, and at the same time played for the youth team, with whom he won the 2006–07 cup and championship, and was chosen youth player of the year. He was also part of the Israel national under-21 football team that reached the UEFA European Under-21 Championship (though he did not play in the tournament itself).

In the 2006–07 season, when the mature team won the state championship, he was mostly a bench player, but at the same time played for the youth team that won the state cup and championship, and was chosen youth player of the year. In the 2007–08 season when the team won both the state championship and the state cup he played in many games, especially at the end of the season.  After that season he received a call to the Israel national football team.

From 2006-13 he played for Beitar Jerusalem. In January 2013, Kozokin transferred to Hapoel Kfar Saba. From 2013-15 he played for Ironi Beit Shemesh.

References

External links 
 About Kozokin from a fan site of Beitar Jerusalem
 An interview with Kozokin after he was chosen youth player of the year 2007
 

1987 births
Living people
Footballers from Moscow
Jewish Israeli sportspeople
Israeli footballers
People from Beit Shemesh
Footballers from Jerusalem District
Association football defenders
Beitar Jerusalem F.C. players
Hapoel Kfar Saba F.C. players
Competitors at the 2005 Maccabiah Games
Maccabiah Games medalists in football
Maccabiah Games gold medalists for Israel
Israel international footballers
Israeli Premier League players
Liga Leumit players
Israeli people of Russian-Jewish descent